The Make-Believe Wife is a lost 1918 American silent comedy film starring Billie Burke and directed by John S. Robertson. Based on an original story for the screen, it was produced by Famous Players-Lasky and distributed by Paramount Pictures.

Cast
Billie Burke as Phyllis Ashbrook
Alfred Hickman as Roger Mason
Ida Darling as Mrs. Ashbrook
David Powell as John Manning
Wray Page as Anita Webb
Isabel O'Madigan as Mrs. Harbury
Frances Kaye as Eileen Harbury
Bigelow Cooper as Mr. Ashbrook
Howard Johnson as Donald Ashbrook
F. Gatenbery Bell as Mr. Harbury

Reception
Like many American films of the time, The Make-Believe Wife was subject to cuts by city and state film censorship boards. For example, the Chicago Board of Censors required a cut, in Reel 4, of the five intertitles "Marian?", "Ethel?", "Daisy?", "Louise, Mabel, Irene," etc., and "Oh, Geraldine", scene of man looking at picture and at woman's underwear and nodding head, and the two intertitles "I give you my word that I don't know who is in that room" and "I thought my past was dead".

References

External links

AllMovie/Synopsis

1918 comedy films
1918 films
1918 lost films
American silent feature films
Lost American films
Paramount Pictures films
Films directed by John S. Robertson
American black-and-white films
Silent American comedy films
Lost comedy films
1910s American films
1910s English-language films
English-language comedy films